Douglas Walter Leckie OBE, AFC, PM (30 June 1920 - 21 November 2007) was an officer in the Royal Australian Air Force and was Commanding Officer of Arctic Flights which assisted the Australian National Arctic Research Expeditions (ANARE) from 1955 to 1957 & 1971 to 1972.

Biography 
Leckie was born in Sandringham, Victoria, the eldest of three children to Captain Peter Martin Leckie and Marie Morris James. After attending Ivanhoe Grammar School, he gained his pilot license at 16 years old, joining the RAAF in 1940, in the Instructors Training Squadron at Point Cook.

He married Dorothy Iva Hornsby, the daughter of business man Gilbert Earle Hornsby and Mildred Marion AhYee. Together they had 3 children.

He served during World War II as a Flying Instructor and Flight Commander at No.2 Elementary Flying School at Archerfield, Brisbane. Serving at various bases throughout Australia and New Guinea, he undertook spotting and surveillance sorties, and later ran safe mail hand, and search and rescue operations in Boomerang Aircraft. During early post-war years, he ran a Flying School in South Gippsland and started the first flying training of the Latrobe Valley Aero Club. In 1951, he re-joined the RAAF, and was posted to Point Cook as a Flying Instructor and Flight Commander.

In 1953 he was appointed Officer in Command of the first post war Antarctic Flight below the Antarctic Circle. He assisted the Australian National Antarctic Research Expedition (ANARE) to set up permanent Australian Antarctic stations to support scientific research and exploratory work, and to establish the Mawson base in 1954. Later that year he was appointed OIC of the RAAF Antarctic Flight, leaving Australia in December 1955 remaining at Mawson for the winter of 1956 and returning in March 1957. This was the first time the RAF had operated an aircraft the entire year below the Antarctic Circle, flying the De Havilland Beaver, using tractor headlights as a flare path during the dark winter months. His leadership and aviation work in Antarctica, commanding the RAAF Antarctic Flights for expeditions and rescue operations from Mawson Station, was so critical that Mount Leckie and The Leckie Range, a group of peaks in Antarctica, were named in his honour.

Leckie returned to the RAF in 1958 to form a third Antarctic Flight to Wilkes Land. He returned to Australia and resumed his flying duties as Senior Pilot with the Snowy Mountains Authority. In 1959 he discharged from the Air Force.

Living in the Gippsland in 1960, Doug started Leckie Aviation Services with the Tiger Moth VH-ABC. From 1962 to 1967, he did agricultural flying at Cootamundra, and when he returned to Victoria, worked as a flying instructor at Moorabbin Airport. He went south again to the Antarctic in 1971 and 1972 with ANARE, flying the Pilatus Porter, the aircraft he loved the most.

After an impressive career in aviation, he worked for the Herald and Weekly Times and Independent newspapers, a nice safe desk job. Leckie lived in Mornington for 30 years. At his funeral service, he was honoured with a Scottish piper and a tribute flyover by the Latrobe Valley Aero Club.

Honours and awards 

 January 1946 - King's Commendation for Meritorious Service in the Air and was also Mentioned in Dispatches
 1955 - Air Force Cross (AFC) for acts of valour, courage and devotion to duty for his role with the ANARE in the Antarctic.
 January 1958 - The Officer of the Order of the British Empire (OBE) (Military Division). Part of that citation reads; "In his leadership of the RAAF Antarctic Flight and his untiring work as a pilot, Squadron Leader Leckie showed great initiative, courage and determination in the face of extreme hardship and difficulties. His abilities contributed greatly to the successful completion by the Expedition of a most valuable and extensive year's work."
 1958 - Oswald Watt Gold Medal for "the most brilliant performance in the air or the most notable contribution to aviation, by an Australian, or in Australia"
 1961 - Polar Medal (PM) for distinguished service in the Antarctic.

References 

Royal Australian Air Force airmen
1920 births
2007 deaths
People educated at Ivanhoe Grammar School
People from Sandringham, Victoria
Royal Australian Air Force personnel of World War II
Military personnel from Melbourne
Australian recipients of the Air Force Cross (United Kingdom)
Recipients of the Polar Medal
Australian Officers of the Order of the British Empire